Coming In is a 2014 German romantic comedy film directed by Marco Kreuzpaintner.

Plot
Tom Herzner, a notoriously hip hairdresser, falls in love with a beauty parlor owner named Heidi. The only problem is that Tom is gay and has never had sex with a woman before. Tom is in a relationship with his business partner and boyfriend Robert, but finds himself falling for Heidi and facing the disapproval of his gay friends and community.

Filmmaker Marco Kreuzpaintner has said that he wanted to give a fresh twist on the genre of romantic comedy, stating how he "loved the idea of a totally politically incorrect story: a gay guy falling in love with a girl, and how this challenges his own and his friends' point of view."

Cast
Kostja Ullmann as Tom Herzner
Aylin Tezel as Heidi
Ken Duken as Robert
Katja Riemann as Berta
August Zirner as Salvatore
Denis Moschitto as Bassam
Tilo Prückner as Erich
Paula Riemann as Maja
Frederick Lau as Didi
 as Sam
Mavie Hörbiger as Mona
Hanno Koffler as Adrian
Eugen Bauder as Joao
 as Julian
André Jung as Harry

References

External links

2014 LGBT-related films
2014 romantic comedy films
Films directed by Marco Kreuzpaintner
Films shot in Berlin
Gay-related films
German LGBT-related films
German romantic comedy films
LGBT-related romantic comedy films
Male bisexuality in film
Warner Bros. films
2010s German-language films
2010s German films